Hand Surgery is a journal on "injury and disease of the hand and upper limb and related research", with an Asia-Pacific perspective. It has been published by World Scientific since 1996 and includes articles on surgical technique, case reports, and information regarding meetings and education programmes.

Abstracting and indexing 
The journal is abstracted in Index Medicus, PubMed, and CSA Calcium and Calcified Tissues Abstracts.

References 

Publications established in 1996
Surgery journals
World Scientific academic journals
English-language journals